Radio Dee-Jay was a rhythmic station based in Tirana, Albania broadcasting mainly dance music. Radio Oxygen, a former non-profit radio station, preceded Radio Dee-Jay on the original frequency of 96.1 MHz and was known for its alternative music format.

Radio stations in Albania
Mass media in Tirana

Defunct mass media in Albania